The Wichita Falls Nighthawks were a professional indoor American football team. They were based in Wichita Falls, Texas. The team was headquartered in Wichita Falls and played its home games at Kay Yeager Coliseum. The Nighthawks were announced as a member of Champions Indoor Football (CIF) for 2018, however, due to litigation, the team ceased operations for the season.

The franchise started as an outdoor American football team that played in different minor leagues before joining the IFL. Their outdoor home was Memorial Stadium in Wichita Falls.

History

The Nighthawks were founded in October 2012 as a minor league outdoor football team by Jerry and Michelle Hughes. They played in the Professional American Football League in 2013 and won the championship. They played in the Gridiron Developmental Football League in 2014 but forfeited the season early due to financial struggles. Hughes sold the team to Drew Carnes in the summer of 2014. Carnes' intention was to turn the franchise into an indoor football team. On August 25, 2014, the Nighthawks became official members of the Indoor Football League, the top indoor league in the country alongside the Arena Football League. On August 26, 2015, James Kerwin was released as the Nighthawks head coach after posting a 4-10 record his first season with the team.

On October 2, 2015, the Nighthawks officially announced that they had hired Billy Back to replace Kerwin. Back had previously been the head coach for the Nashville Venom, where he guided the Venom to a 2014 Professional Indoor Football League championship. Back helped the Nighthawks highest scoring offense in the IFL and an 11–5 record and their first ever indoor football playoff appearance. The Nighthawks lost their first playoff game 36–66 to the Cedar Rapids Titans.

The Nighthawks repeated as the highest scoring offense in the IFL, but with the removal of wildcards from the playoffs, the Nighthawks missed the playoffs. After the 2017 IFL season, owner Drew Carnes applied for membership in Champions Indoor Football in order to lower travel costs and league instability. Carnes had been losing $250,000 each of the previous two seasons with their closest travel game being eight hours away in Grand Island, Nebraska.

On September 12, 2017, the Nighthawks announced that they had joined the CIF and signed a new three-year lease with the Yeager Coliseum. However, in October, the IFL notified the Nighthawks and the CIF of pending litigation against them for their withdrawal from the IFL. The CIF responded by stating they could not schedule the Nighthawks for 2018, leaving the Nighthawks league affiliation undetermined. With the operational costs too high to return to the IFL and the lawsuit preventing them from playing in the CIF, the Nighthawks ceased operations.

Players

All-League selections
 QB Charles McCullum (2)
 RB Tyler Williams (2)
 WR Jordan Jolly (2)
 DL Terrance Lloyd, Walter Thomas (2)
 LB/DB James Ackel
 K Rockne Belmonte (2)
 KR Tyler Williams

Individual awards

2017 Staff

Statistics and records

Season-by-season results

Head coach records

References

External links
 Wichita Falls Nighthawks official website

 
Champions Indoor Football teams
Former Indoor Football League teams
Defunct American football teams in Texas
Sports in Wichita Falls, Texas
American football teams established in 2012
2012 establishments in Texas